United Nations Security Council Resolution 177, adopted unanimously on October 15, 1962, after examining the application of Uganda for membership in the United Nations, the Council recommended to the General Assembly that Uganda be admitted.

See also
 List of United Nations Security Council Resolutions 101 to 200 (1953–1965)

References
Text of the Resolution at undocs.org

External links
 

 0177
History of Uganda
Foreign relations of Uganda
 0177
 0177
1962 in Uganda
October 1962 events